Lee Dong-hwi (born July 22, 1985) is a South Korean actor and singer. He gained recognition through his role in the critically acclaimed television series Reply 1988 (2015–2016). Lee starred in the film Extreme Job (2019), the second highest-grossing South Korean film in history. He is also a member of South Korean supergroup MSG Wannabe.

Personal life
Lee has been in a relationship with model-actress Jung Ho-yeon since 2015. 

He is part of a celebrity group of friends known as BYH48 which consists of EXO's Suho, Ryu Jun-yeol, Byun Yo-han, Ji Soo and more. The name was coined by their fans, with BYH referring to Byun Yo-han - the group's leader - and 48 is a parody of Japanese idol group AKB48.

In May 2021, Lee was revealed as one of the MSG Wannabe members who passed on variety show program Hangout with Yoo and debuted as a member of MSG Wannabe and was part of the sub-unit JSDK.

Philanthropy 
On March 8, 2022, Lee donated  million to the Hope Bridge Disaster Relief Association to help those affected by the massive wildfires that started in Uljin, Gyeongbuk. and also spread to Samcheok, Gangwon. 

On August 18, 2022, Lee donated  to help those affected by the 2022 South Korean floods through the Hope Bridge Korea Disaster Relief Association.

Filmography

Film

Television series

Web shows

Radio shows

Music videos

Discography

Singles

Awards and nominations

References

External links
 Lee Dong-hwi at Huayi Brothers 

1985 births
Living people
South Korean male film actors
South Korean male television actors
Seoul Institute of the Arts alumni
21st-century South Korean male actors